Alan Field Shugart (September 27, 1930 – December 12, 2006) was an American engineer, entrepreneur and business executive whose career defined the modern computer disk drive industry.

Personal history
Born in Los Angeles, he graduated from the University of Redlands, receiving a degree in engineering physics.

Shugart was the father of three children: Joanne Shugart (1951–1954), Christopher D. Shugart (b. 1953) and Teri L.K. Shugart (b. 1955). Shugart was married to Esther Marrs (née Bell), the mother of his three children, from 1951 until 1973. He was married to Rita Shugart (née Kennedy) from 1981 until his death.

Shugart died on December 12, 2006 in Monterey, California of complications from heart surgery he had undergone six weeks earlier.

Career
He began his career in 1951 as a field engineer at IBM.  In 1955 he transferred to the IBM San Jose laboratory where he worked on the IBM 305 RAMAC. He rose through a series of increasingly important positions to become the Direct Access Storage Product Manager, responsible for disk storage products, IBM's most profitable businesses at that time. Among the groups reporting to Shugart was the team that invented the floppy disk.

Shugart joined Memorex in 1969 as Vice President of its Equipment Division and led the development of its 3660 (compatible with IBM 2314) and 3670 (compatible with IBM 3330) disk storage subsystems.  His team also developed the Memorex 650, one of the first commercially available floppy disk drives.

He founded Shugart Associates in February 1973 and resigned as CEO in October 1974. The company was later acquired by Xerox. Then he and Finis Conner started Shugart Technology in 1979, which soon changed its name to Seagate Technology.

With Shugart as CEO, Seagate became the world’s largest independent manufacturer of disk drives and related components. In July 1998, Shugart resigned his positions with Seagate.

Political activity
In 1996, he launched an unsuccessful campaign to elect Ernest, his Bernese Mountain Dog, to Congress. Shugart later wrote about that experience in a book, Ernest Goes to Washington (Well, Not Exactly). He backed a failed ballot initiative in 2000 to give California voters the option of choosing "none of the above" in elections.

Awards
He received the 1997 IEEE Reynold B. Johnson Information Storage Systems Award. In 2005, he was made a Fellow of the Computer History Museum "for his lifelong contributions to the creation of the modern disk drive industry."

References

External links
Al Shugart's Speech At Conference marking 100th Anniversary of Magnetic Recording, December 14, 1998
Al Shugart milestones at Computer History Museum
Al Shugart biography at Computer History Museum

1930 births
2006 deaths
American computer businesspeople
American manufacturing businesspeople
American technology chief executives
Businesspeople from the San Francisco Bay Area
IBM employees
University of Redlands alumni